Olympiazentrum is an U-Bahn station in Munich on the U3 of the Munich U-Bahn system. It was opened on 8 May 1972 for the 1972 Summer Olympics and services Munich's Olympiapark and its Olympic Village, and also those who want to visit the BMW museum.

See also
List of Munich U-Bahn stations

References

External links

Munich U-Bahn stations
Railway stations in Germany opened in 1972
1972 establishments in West Germany